Apartment Hunting is a 2000 Canadian romantic comedy film directed by Bill Robertson. Its soundtrack contains much of the recorded oeuvre of cult musician Mary Margaret O'Hara, who also appears in the film.

Premise
Ben Riddick (Andrew Tarbet), an unhappily married journalist is forced to confront his feelings for his wife Sarah (Kari Matchett) when he is assigned by his employer to write a story about telephone personals services.

Cast
 Andrew Tarbet as Ben Reddick
 Kari Matchett as Sarah
 Matt Gordon as Mac McConnell
 Tracy Wright as Steve
 Arnold Pinnock as Dean
 Rachel Hayward as Lola
 John Evans as Victor Spoils
 Mary Margaret O'Hara as Hellen
 Valérie Jeanneret as Celine / Annie
 Linda Kash as Realtor
 Ralph Benmergui as Thurston Peacock III
 Rosemary Radcliffe as Poncho Woman
 Elena Kudaba as Cabbage Woman
 Bill Lake as Lecherous Man
 Oscar Hsu as Landlord

References

External links
 

2000 films
2000 romantic comedy films
English-language Canadian films
2000s English-language films
Canadian romantic comedy films
Films shot in Toronto
2000s Canadian films